Fun2shh: Dudes in the 10th Century is a 2003 Indian Hindi-language science fiction comedy film written and directed by Imtiaz Punjabi and produced by Seema Kar and Dhilin Mehta under Shree Ashtavinayak Cine Vision Limited, with a script co-written by Pravin Rai and Rajesh Khattar. The film stars Paresh Rawal, Gulshan Grover, Anuj Sawhney, television actor Mohammed Iqbal Khan and actress Natanya Singh in their film debuts, Raima Sen and Farida Jalal. The music is composed by Pritam and the background score by Salim–Sulaiman, in their first mainstream collaboration.

Plot

Mumbai lives in fear of a notorious thief who calls himself Chindi Chor, and steals whenever and whatever he desires without any regard to security, and police protection. When Ghoshal announces the exhibition and subsequent auction of a crown once worn by Emperor Babushah, Chindi challenges him that he is going to steal this priceless crown, and Ghoshal accepts the challenge, and hires private security guards. Chindi carries out the theft, and two of the security guards, Vikram and Ajay, and an accomplice, John D'Souza, become prime suspects, and are on the run. They must apprehend Chindi and recover the crown to absolve themselves of this crime. While being chased by security guards, the trio crash into a wall, and are transported back to the 10th century, straight into the palace of Emperor Babushah himself. The trio think they are on the sets of a Bollywood film, and take nothing seriously, until they are imprisoned. It is then the hapless trio realize that they must not only escape, but must also take the crown, back with them to the 21st century to absolve themselves of this crime. Only a miracle can get them back to the 21st century.

Cast

Paresh Rawal as John D’Souza (Johnny)
Mohammad Iqbal Khan as Vikram "Vicky" Rajput
Anuj Sawhney as Ajay "Ajju" Sharma
Gulshan Grover as Chindi Chor / Babushah
Natanya Singh as the First Princess Junali
Raima Sen as the Second Princess Rudali
Farida Jalal as Mrs. Preeti D'Souza / Hiraka
Rushali Arora as Maria/Shalaka
Kader Khan as Bhaleram / Goatherd
Paintal (comedian) as scientist of 10th century
Narendra Jha as Babushah's Commander 
Ashish Vidyarthi as Ghoshal Roshan
Bobby Darling as one of King Babushah's 40 wives
Virendra Saxena as Inspector Chhatri Pal
Niloufer as King Babushah's 1st wife
Kavi Kumar Azad
Amitabh Bachchan as the Narrator

Music
The songs are written by Pravin Rai, Nitin Raikwar and Amitabh Verma.

References

External links
 

2003 films
2000s Hindi-language films
Films featuring songs by Pritam
2000s science fiction comedy films
Films about time travel
Indian science fiction comedy films
Films set in the 21st century
Films set in the 10th century
2003 comedy films